Choe Ung-chon (born 15 May 1982) is a North Korean former footballer. He represented North Korea on at least twelve occasions between 2001 and 2005, scoring once.

Career statistics

Club

Notes

International

International goals
Scores and results list North Korea's goal tally first, score column indicates score after each North Korea goal.

References

1982 births
Living people
North Korean footballers
North Korea international footballers
Association football forwards
North Korean expatriate footballers
Expatriate footballers in Cambodia